Bheri Sygmond Ramsaran (born 16 March 1959) is a Guyanese politician and doctor. Minister of Health of Guyana in 2011–2015.

Biography 
Bheri Sygmond Ramsaran was born on March 16, 1959. In 1987 he graduated from the Medical faculty of Peoples' Friendship University and later also went through an internship. In 1987, he went to work at Georgetown Hospital, and a year later he moved to New Amsterdam Hospital; he also worked in Skeldon and Port Morant hospitals as a surgeon. In 1996, he was appointed as the Director of the Department of Regional Health under the Ministry of Health of Guyana.

In 1977 he joined the People's Progressive Party of Guyana. He was a member of the Central and Executive Committees of the party and was the party secretary for public education. In 1998 he was elected member of the National Assembly of Guyana.

In 2011, he was appointed Minister of Health of Guyana. In 2015, he was dismissed from his post by President Donald Ramotar after a scandal when publicly insulted LGBT activist Sherlin Nagir. Because of this incident, Ramsaran was indicted in a court. 

He is single and has no children.

References

1959 births
Peoples' Friendship University of Russia alumni
Living people